Danielle Gaubert (9 August 1943 – 4 November 1987) was a French actress.

Born in Nuars, Danielle Gaubert was discovered at 16 years old by Claude Autant-Lara, who chose her for the film Les régates de San Francisco, and soon after appeared in a number of German and Italian productions, including Flight from Ashiya (1964),  (1968), Camille 2000 (1969) and Underground (1970). In 1963 she married Radhamés Trujillo Martínez, a son of the Dominican dictator Rafael Trujillo, but they divorced in 1968.

During the shooting of her last movie Snow Job, she met the ski champion Jean-Claude Killy, whom she married in 1972. She left showbusiness and had a daughter. At the age of 44, she died of cancer.

Filmography

References

External links 
 

1943 births
French film actresses
People from Nièvre
1987 deaths
Deaths from cancer in France
20th-century French actresses